Vännäs TV Tower is a Swedish concrete television tower that has a mast on top. It is used for transmitting FM-/TV-broadcasting.

The Vännäs TV Tower resembles the Gerbrandy Tower in IJsselstein, the Netherlands. They both are a concrete tower with a steel mast on top that is guyed to the ground.

Vännäs TV Tower was close to collapsing due to heavy icing in 1988. They managed to save the tower by spraying hot water and glycol from a helicopter.

Geography 

Vännäs TV Tower lies in the  statistical-designated place of Vännäs, which in turn, is the seat of the municipality of Vännäs, in the county of Västerbotten, situated in the northern part of the Kingdom of Sweden.

See also 

Vännäs
Gerbrandy Tower, 
List of tallest towers in the world
List of tallest structures in Sweden

References 

Towers completed in 1988
Television in Sweden
Communication towers in Sweden
Tourist attractions in Västerbotten County
Buildings and structures in Västerbotten County